Vanni Electoral District is one of the 22 multi-member electoral districts of Sri Lanka created by the 1978 Constitution of Sri Lanka. The district covers the administrative districts of Mannar, Mullaitivu and Vavuniya in the Northern province. The district currently elects 6 of the 225 members of the Sri Lankan Parliament and had 253,058 registered electors in 2014.

Election results

1982 presidential election
Results of the 1st presidential election held on 20 October 1982:

1988 provincial council election
Results of the 1st North Eastern provincial council election held on 19 November 1988:

Mannar District - The Eelam People's Revolutionary Liberation Front won all 5 seats uncontested.

Mullaitivu District - The Eelam National Democratic Liberation Front won all 5 seats uncontested.

Vavuniya District - The Eelam National Democratic Liberation Front won all 4 seats uncontested.

1988 presidential election
Results of the 2nd presidential election held on 19 December 1988:

1989 parliamentary general election
Results of the 9th parliamentary election held on 15 February 1989:

The following candidates were elected: A. E. Silva (EPRLF), 6,385 preference votes (pv); R. Kuhaneswaran (TELO), 6,276 pv; S. S. M. Abu Bakar (SLMC), 5,355 pv; Rasamanohari Pulendran (UNP), 3,260 pv; and Innasimuthu Alfred (EROS), 935 pv.

1994 parliamentary general election
Results of the 10th parliamentary election held on 16 August 1994:

The following candidates were elected: D. Siddarthan (DPLF-PLOTE), 6,376 preference votes (pv); S. Shanmuganathan (DPLF), 5,858 pv; V. Balachandran (DPLF), 4,515 pv; S. S. M. Abu Bakar (SLMC), 4,269 pv; Premaratnage Sumathipala (PA), 2,975 pv; and Rasamanohari Pulendran (UNP), 2,217 pv.

S. Shanmuganathan (DPLF) was killed on 15 July 1998.

1994 presidential election
Results of the 3rd presidential election held on 9 November 1994:

1999 presidential election
Results of the 4th presidential election held on 21 December 1999:

2000 parliamentary general election
Results of the 11th parliamentary election held on 10 October 2000:

The following candidates were elected: Selvam Adaikalanathan (TELO), 15,490 preference votes (pv); Noordeen Mashoor (NUA), 12,283 pv; Vino Noharathalingam (TELO), 10,959 pv; R. Kuhaneswaran (TELO), 6,739 pv; Premaratnage Sumathipala (PA), 5,205 pv; and Santhakumara Punchihewa (UNP), 3,975 pv.

2001 parliamentary general election
Results of the 12th parliamentary election held on 5 December 2001:

The following candidates were elected: Selvam Adaikalanathan (TNA-TELO), 28,548 preference votes (pv); R. Kuhaneswaran (TNA-TELO), 15,936 pv; Sivasakthy Ananthan (TNA-EPRLF), 14,023 pv; Noordeen Mashoor (UNF), 12,673 pv; Rishad Bathiudeen (UNF-SLMC), 9,276 pv; and D. Siddarthan (DPLF-PLOTE), 4,468 pv.

2004 parliamentary general election
Results of the 13th parliamentary election held on 2 April 2004:

The following candidates were elected: Selvam Adaikalanathan (TNA-TELO), 39,535  preference votes (pv); S. Kanagaratnam (TNA), 30,390 pv; Sivasakthy Ananthan (TNA-EPRLF), 29,801 pv; Vino Noharathalingam (TNA-TELO), 28,252 pv; Sivanathan Kisshor (TNA), 17,653 pv; and Rishad Bathiudeen (UNF-SLMC), 15,981 pv.

2005 presidential election
Results of the 5th presidential election held on 17 November 2005:

2010 presidential election
Results of the 6th presidential election held on 26 January 2010:

2010 parliamentary general election
Results of the 14th parliamentary election held on 8 April 2010:

The following candidates were elected: Rishad Bathiudeen (UPFA-ACMC), 27,461  preference votes (pv); Selvam Adaikalanathan (TNA-TELO), 17,366 pv; Vino Noharathalingam (TNA-TELO), 12,120 pv; Sivasakthy Ananthan (TNA-EPRLF), 11,674 pv; Hunais Farook (UPFA-ACMC), 10,851 pv; and Noordeen Mashoor (UNF-SLMC), 9,518 pv.

Noordeen Mashoor (UPFA-SLMC) died on 2 December 2010. His replacement Muthali Bawa Farook (UPFA-SLMC) was sworn in on 5 January 2011.

2013 provincial council election
Results of the 1st Northern provincial council election held on 21 September 2013:

Mannar District

Mullaitivu District

Vavuniya District

2015 presidential election
Results of the 7th presidential election held on 8 January 2015:

References

Electoral districts of Sri Lanka
Politics of Mannar District
Politics of Mullaitivu District
Politics of Vavuniya District